Gibberula cavinae is a species of sea snail, a marine gastropod mollusk, in the family Cystiscidae.

References

cavinae
Gastropods described in 2010